The Stafford Challenge Cup is an Indian football tournament held in Karnataka, organized by the Karnataka State Football Association (KSFA). Instituted in 1938, it is the oldest football tournament in South India. It was abolished in 1993, but the tournament was revived in 2023.

History
The Stafford Challenge Cup was introduced by Staffordshire Regiment in 1938 in Bengaluru. They also donated the silver rolling trophy. Bangalore Muslim Club was the first Indian club to win it in 1941.

In 1990, the Iraqi Olympic team won the tournament but didn't return the trophy since the cup was lost during the Gulf War. It was held for the then-last time in 1993, before the revival 30 years later.

Venue
The older edition matches used to be held at M. Chinnaswamy Stadium and Vyalikaval Ground. The revived edition is held at Bangalore Football Stadium.

Awards

Results

References

Football cup competitions in India
Football in Karnataka
1938 establishments in India
Recurring sporting events established in 1938